Yong Lee-Ja (born March 29, 1991 in Pyongyang) is a North Korean football forward.

He was last playing with Serbian SuperLiga club FK Napredak Kruševac.

He can play either as forward or attacking midfielder. He has been with Napredak since summer 2009. As of 2015, he is the second North Korean footballer to play in the Serbian SuperLiga after the international Hong Yong-Jo. In December 2009 he went on trials along his compatriot An Il-bom, playing also in Serbia but with FK Radnički 1923, to Croatian side NK Zagreb.

His name sometime appears as Yong Lee-Ya.

References

External sources
 
 Yong Lee-Ja at Srbijafudbal
 

Living people
1991 births
Sportspeople from Pyongyang
North Korean footballers
North Korean expatriate footballers
North Korean expatriate sportspeople in Serbia
FK Napredak Kruševac players
Serbian SuperLiga players
Expatriate footballers in Serbia
Association football forwards